Atul Vidyalaya is an ICSE school based in Atul, Gujarat, India, and was founded in 1991 by Shri Kasturbhai Lalbhai.

It is an English medium school, up to standard 12. The school is affiliated to the Council for the Indian School Certificate Examinations (ICSE), New Delhi. Students of standard 9 and 10 appear for the ICSE (Indian Certificate of Secondary Education). Students of standard 11 and 12 appear for the ISC (Indian School Certificate)

References

External links
Atul Vidyalaya School

Schools in Gujarat